Westmont is an unincorporated community in Los Angeles County, California, a part of the South Los Angeles area, just east of Inglewood. The population was 33,913 at the 2020 census, up from 31,853 at the 2010 census.

Geography
It adjoins the Vermont Vista neighborhood of the city of Los Angeles.

History

In 2009, Westmont was the subject of a feature story by Hector Tobar in the Los Angeles Times who wrote that the community was "officially (but rarely) called Westmont" but that it had "no "'mont,' not even a hill. It got its name, it seems, from being west of Vermont Avenue." Tobar noted that Westmont's unemployment rate was at the time "a staggering 23.6%, the highest in Los Angeles County."

Five years later, the strip of Vermont Avenue which is shared between Westmont and Vermont Vista was called "death alley" by the newspaper because during the past seven years sixty people had been killed by violence on that two-mile stretch. It remained at the highest rate of killings of any neighborhood in Los Angeles County.

The 2014 article stated that "The area was long been controlled by a gang named the Underground Crips, whose members would, in more violent days, walk across Normandie Avenue to shoot at rivals."

Population

According to the Los Angeles Times, fewer than six percent of residents held bachelor's degrees in 2000.  The neighborhood is fraught with gang and police-related violence, as well as structural racism and entrenched poverty.

For statistical purposes, the United States Census Bureau has designated the unincorporated area as a census designated place (CDP).

2010
In the 2010 census Westmont had a population of 31,853. The racial makeup of Westmont was 16,262 (51.1%) African American, 5,037 (15.8%) white (including 1.0% non-Hispanic white), 188 (0.6%) Native American, 126 (0.4%) Asian, 31 (0.1%) Pacific Islander, 9,180 (28.8%) from other races, and 1,029 (3.2%) from two or more races. Hispanic or Latino of any race were 14,871 persons (46.7%).

The census reported that 31,693 people (99.5% of the population) lived in households, 119 (0.4%) lived in non-institutionalized group quarters, and 41 (0.1%) were institutionalized.

There were 9,695 households, 4,750 (49.0%) had children under the age of 18 living in them, 2,995 (30.9%) were opposite-sex married couples living together, 3,194 (32.9%) had a female householder with no husband present, 904 (9.3%) had a male householder with no wife present.  There were 776 (8.0%) unmarried opposite-sex partnerships, and 52 (0.5%) same-sex married couples or partnerships. 2,141 households (22.1%) were one person and 669 (6.9%) had someone living alone who was 65 or older. The average household size was 3.27.  There were 7,093 families (73.2% of households); the average family size was 3.78.

The age distribution was 9,860 people (31.0%) under the age of 18, 3,759 people (11.8%) aged 18 to 24, 8,577 people (26.9%) aged 25 to 44, 6,979 people (21.9%) aged 45 to 64, and 2,678 people (8.4%) who were 65 or older.  The median age was 29.9 years. For every 100 females, there were 86.8 males.  For every 100 females age 18 and over, there were 80.3 males.

There were 10,588 housing units at an average density of 5,730.6 per square mile, of the occupied units 3,012 (31.1%) were owner-occupied and 6,683 (68.9%) were rented. The homeowner vacancy rate was 2.5%; the rental vacancy rate was 8.8%.  10,864 people (34.1% of the population) lived in owner-occupied housing units and 20,829 people (65.4%) lived in rental housing units.

2000
In the 2000 census there were 31,623 people, 9,255 households, and 7,089 families living in the CDP. The population density was 17,103.0 inhabitants per square mile (6,599.8/km). The racial makeup of the CDP was 11.8% White, 58.0% African American, 0.6% Native American, 0.4% Asian, 0.2% Pacific Islander, 25.8% from other races, and 3.3% from two or more races. Hispanic or Latino of any race were 39.5%.

Of the 9,255 households 47.3% had children under the age of 18 living with them, 33.9% were married couples living together, 34.9% had a female householder with no husband present, and 23.4% were non-families. 19.2% of households were one person and 5.0% were one person aged 65 or older.  The average household size was 3.41 and the average family size was 3.85.

The age distribution was 37.8% under the age of 18, 10.5% from 18 to 24, 29.3% from 25 to 44, 16.3% from 45 to 64, and 6.0% 65 or older.  The median age was 26 years. For every 100 females, there were 86.6 males.  For every 100 females age 18 and over, there were 78.5 males.

The median household income was $23,323 and the median family income was $23,712. Males had a median income of $24,682 versus $25,775 for females. The per capita income for the CDP was $9,765.  About 35.3% of families and 36.9% of the population were below the poverty line, including 46.7% of those under age 18 and 22.1% of those age 65 or over.

Education
The area is within the Los Angeles Unified School District.

Areas considered to be in Westmont are generally zoned to:
 Century Park Elementary School
 Woodcrest Elementary School
 Washington Preparatory High School
 Middle College High School 
 Animo South Los Angeles Charter High School

Library Service
 Woodcrest Community Library, County of Los Angeles Public Library

Government

Law enforcement is provided by the Los Angeles County Sheriff's Department.

Notable residents
 
 Ice Cube (O'Shea Jackson), rapper, actor, writer, producer, and director.

See also
 Killing of Dijon Kizzee

References

Census-designated places in Los Angeles County, California
South Los Angeles
Census-designated places in California